Local elections were held in Bacoor on May 9, 2016, within the Philippine general election. The voters will elect for the elective local posts in the city: the mayor, the vice mayor, the lone district representative, the two provincial board members for Cavite, and the twelve councilors, six in each of the city's two local legislative districts.

Background
Incumbent Edwin "Strike" Revilla is already in his third term as mayor of Bacoor; therefore he is disqualified from running for another term for the same position despite Bacoor's change in status as a city in 2012.  He will be running for representative to switch positions with his sister-in-law, Lani Mercado-Revilla.  Her opponents are former municipal vice mayor and provincial board member Edwin Malvar and incumbent provincial board member Rolando "Andoy" Remulla.

On the other hand, incumbent vice mayor Catherine Sariño-Evaristo will be Representative Mercado-Revilla's running mate.  Her announced opponents are former city Business Permits and Licensing Office head Allen Reyes and former municipal councilor and three-term provincial board member Cesario "Jun" Del Rosario Jr., who recently is an executive producer, editor and deputy chief of reporters at CNN Philippines.

Results
The candidates for mayor, vice mayor, and district representative with the highest number of votes wins the seat; they are voted separately, therefore, they may be of different parties when elected.

Incumbent officials are expressed in italics.

Mayor

Vice Mayor

District Representative
Incumbent mayor Strike Revilla is switching positions with his sister-in-law.  He is said to be running unopposed as his perceived opponent, former municipal mayor Jessie Castillo, decided not to run for any position in this year's elections.

Provincial Board members

Voters will elect two board members at-large, regardless of whether these voters are from Bacoor West or Bacoor East.  Incumbent board member Edralin "Aba" Gawaran, who was nationally known as one of the right-hand men of detained Senator Ramon "Bong" Revilla Jr. when he was arrested and taken to jail for corruption charges in 2014 in connection with the PDAF scam, will vie for re-election.  His partner for the other slot within Team Revilla is graduating city councilor Reynaldo Fabian.  They will be opposed by former three-term municipal councilor Peter Simon Lara, transport operator and businessperson Neil Ragasa, and Rosalina Francisco.

Remulla, the other incumbent board member, is running for mayor.

|bgcolor=black colspan=5|

Councilors

Team Revilla

Team Malvar

Team Andoy

Results

Each legislative district elects six councilors to the City Council. The six candidates with the highest number of votes wins these seats.

Bacoor West District

|bgcolor=black colspan=5|

Bacoor East District

|bgcolor=black colspan=5|

Notes

References

2016 Philippine local elections
Elections in Bacoor
2016 elections in Calabarzon